Reino Kalervo Kangasmäki (2 July 1916 – 26 September 2010) was a journalist and a Greco-Roman wrestler from Finland. He won a bronze medal in the flyweight class at the 1948 Olympics, his only major international tournament. At the national championships Kangasmäki placed third in 1943 and second in 1947.

Kangasmäki was born in a family of a lumberjack. He started training in wrestling around 1935 and retired in 1951. In 1953, he started as a journalist for the newspaper Kansan Ääni, and eventually became its chief editor.

References

1916 births
2010 deaths
People from Kokkola
Wrestlers at the 1948 Summer Olympics
Finnish male sport wrestlers
Olympic wrestlers of Finland
Olympic bronze medalists for Finland
Olympic medalists in wrestling
Medalists at the 1948 Summer Olympics
Finnish journalists
20th-century Finnish people
21st-century Finnish people